Scincella przewalskii  is a species of skink. It is endemic to Gansu province in Northwest China.

References

Scincella
Reptiles of China
Endemic fauna of Gansu
Reptiles described in 1912
Taxa named by Jacques von Bedriaga